The 2013–14 season was Paris Saint-Germain Football Club's 44th in existence and their 41st in the top-flight of French football. The team competed in Ligue 1, the Coupe de France, the Coupe de la Ligue, the Trophée des Champions and the UEFA Champions League.

Summary

After Ezequiel Lavezzi, Thiago Silva, Marco Verratti, Zlatan Ibrahimović and Gregory van der Wiel, who all arrived in the summer of 2012, Paris Saint-Germain made another big impact in the summer transfer window 12 months later. Lucas Digne, Marquinhos and Edinson Cavani all joined the squad now coached by Laurent Blanc, who replaced Carlo Ancelotti. The defending Ligue 1 champions hit the ground running with a 2-1 victory over Girondins de Bordeaux to snare the first silverware of the new season, the 2013 Trophée des Champions in Libreville, Gabon.

In Ligue 1, the season opened with a 1-1 draw away to Montpellier, followed by a 1-1 draw at home to AC Ajaccio, which saw Edinson Cavani open his account with Les Rouge-et-Bleu. In Week 3, Laurent Blanc's men recorded their first win of the new season, against Nantes, 2-1. After this slow start to Ligue 1, Blanc's change to a three-man midfield composed by Blaise Matuidi, Thiago Motta and Verratti in a 4-3-3 system during a 2-0 away win over Bordeaux in early September was the pivotal moment. It took just four more games before PSG permanently overhauled early pacesetters Monaco at the top of the table. After another 2-0 wins over Guingamp, the capital club were back in UEFA Champions League action. The objective was to at least do as well as the previous season where the side was eliminated in the quarter-finals on the away goals rule against Barcelona (2-2 and 1-1). And Paris started in style away to Olympiacos with a 4-1 win.

After being held 1-1 by Monaco, and two wins over Valenciennes (1-0) and Toulouse (2-0), Paris enjoyed a week rich in emotions. First up was Benfica at home, before a trip to Olympique de Marseille's Stade Vélodrome. Les Rouge-et-Bleu made light work of their home clash, defeating the Portuguese side 3-0, for a second straight Champions League game. And then came one of the turning points of the season. Reduced to ten men and trailing on the scoreboard, Paris came from behind to defeat OM 2-1, before racking up the victories in October and November, defeating Bastia (4-0), Anderlecht (5-0), Lorient (4-0), Nice (3-1) and Stade de Reims (3-0). Only Saint-Étienne (2-2) and Anderlecht (1-1) took points. The series continued with Olympiacos (2-1), which confirmed qualification for the last-16 of the Champions League, and Olympique Lyonnais (4-0) where Paris really impressed.

The two first defeats of the season, against Evian (0-2) and Benfica (1-2) changed little. Laurent Blanc's men continued to dominate with big wins over Sochaux-Montbéliard (5-0) and Stade Rennais (3-1), before qualifying for the quarter-finals of the Coupe de la Ligue after extra time against Saint-Étienne. A 2-2 with Lille in the final game of the calendar year saw Paris sitting atop the standings. Stade Brest (5-2, Coupe de France last 64), Ajaccio (2-1), Bordeaux (3-1, Coupe de la Ligue quarter-finals) and Nantes (5-0) all fell against the champions. The Coupe de France defeat at home to Montpellier (1-2) in the last 32 was the season's low note. However, Les Parisiens followed up with victories over Bordeaux (2-0) and Nantes (2-1).

Monaco held the club to another draw (1-1), but it only sparked the side into a streak of 11 wins in a row. In the 2014 Coupe de France Final, against Lyon, Paris won 2-1 and collected their second title of the season after the Trophée des Champions. Paris then defeated Evian TG 1-0, before drawing with Sochaux 1-1 and were crowned French champions before entering the field to play against Rennes (1-2), after Monaco failed to win. It was a second consecutive league title, the fourth in the club's history, and the third trophy of the season.

Players

Players, transfers, appearances and goals - 2013/2014 season.

First-team squad

Out on loan

Transfers in

Transfers out

Statistics

Appearances and goals

|-
! colspan="18" style="background:#dcdcdc; text-align:center"| Goalkeepers

|-
! colspan="18" style="background:#dcdcdc; text-align:center"| Defenders

|-
! colspan="18" style="background:#dcdcdc; text-align:center"| Midfielders

|-
! colspan="18" style="background:#dcdcdc; text-align:center"| Forwards

|-
! colspan="18" style="background:#dcdcdc; text-align:center"| Players transferred out during the season
|-

Competitions

Trophée des Champions

Ligue 1

League table

Results summary

Results by round

Matches

Coupe de France

Coupe de la Ligue

UEFA Champions League

Group stage

Knockout phase

Round of 16

Quarter-finals

References

External links

Official websites
PSG.fr – Site officiel
Paris Saint-Germain  at LFP
Paris Saint-Germain at UEFA
Paris Saint-Germain at FIFA

Paris Saint-Germain F.C. seasons
Paris Saint-Germain
Paris Saint-Germain
French football championship-winning seasons